Cevo is an Italian comune in Val Camonica, province of Brescia,  Lombardy, northern Italy.
 
Neighbouring communes are Saviore dell'Adamello and Berzo Demo. It is located near Valle Camonica near the slopes of Adamello.

History

On April 22, 1644, most of the town of Cevo was burned down by a fire started by lightning. On July 3, 1944, most of the houses in the town were either damaged, destroyed, or looted by the combined Wehrmacht and Italian Fascist forces, in retaliation for activities by the partisans. Six people were killed and two-thirds of the 1,200 residents were left homeless.

Main sights

Churches Cevo are:
 Church of St. Sixtus of the sixteenth century from earlier Romanesque building, surrounded by a small cemetery.
 Parish of San Vigilio of the sixteenth century
 Church of Sant 'Antonio Abate

Culture
The scütüm are in camunian dialect nicknames, sometimes personal, elsewhere showing the characteristic features of a community.  The one which characterize the people of Cevo is Barlócc.

Twin towns
Cevo is twinned with:

  Trezzo sull'Adda, Italy

References

External links

Historical photos - Intercam  
Historical photos - Lombardia Beni Culturali 

Cities and towns in Lombardy